Gerald Koh Mun Yew (born 20 June 1978) is a Singaporean former backstroke, freestyle and medley swimmer. He competed in five events at the 1996 Summer Olympics.

Swimming career 
Koh won the bronze medal in the 200m backstroke at the 2001 Southeast Asian Games.

Koh retired from competitive swimming in 2003.

Personal life 
Koh has an elder brother, Desmond Koh, who is also a former swimmer for Singapore.

References

External links
 

1978 births
Living people
Singaporean male backstroke swimmers
Singaporean male freestyle swimmers
Singaporean male medley swimmers
Olympic swimmers of Singapore
Swimmers at the 1996 Summer Olympics
Place of birth missing (living people)
Swimmers at the 2002 Asian Games
Asian Games competitors for Singapore
21st-century Singaporean people